Joseph Day represented Dedham, Massachusetts in the Great and General Court.

References

Works cited

Year of birth missing
Year of death missing
Members of the Massachusetts General Court